Brian Milligan (born 1982/1983) is a Northern Irish actor known for his role in the television crime drama The Fall.

Background
Milligan grew up in Belfast with his 5 siblings. He attended secondary school at Lagan College. Milligan is an amateur football player for Newtownbreda and supports Arsenal F.C.

While at school he starred in his first television role in Safe and Sound, alongside fellow Northern Ireland actor Michelle Fairley. He also performed on stage at the Royal National Theatre in London. Milligan attended drama school in England.

Filmography

References

External links
 

20th-century male actors from Northern Ireland
21st-century male actors from Northern Ireland
Living people
Male film actors from Northern Ireland
Male television actors from Northern Ireland
1980s births